Brian Pinkney (born August 28, 1961, Boston, Massachusetts) is an American illustrator.

His father, Jerry Pinkney, was an illustrator and his mother, Gloria Jean, was an author, milliner, and silversmith.  Both had studios in their home.  Pinkney was encouraged by his parents to use the materials in the studio.  He went on to earn a Bachelor of Fine Arts degree from the Philadelphia College of Art in 1983 and after working as a freelance illustrator for several years, he returned to college.  This time, he earned a Master of Fine Arts degree in illustration from the School of Visual Arts in 1990.

As of 2019, he is living with his wife Andrea Davis Pinkney and their two children in Brooklyn, New York.  They often work together on projects and between them, have published over seventy children's books.

Honors and awards

Pinkney has won two Caldecott Honors, four Coretta Scott King Honors and a Coretta Scott King Award, and the Boston Globe Horn Book Award.

Caldecott Honors 

 The Faithful Friend (1997)
 Duke Ellington: The Piano Prince and His Orchestra (1999)

Coretta Scott King Illustrator Award 

 In the Time of the Drums (2000)

Coretta Scott King Illustrator Honor 

 Sukey and the Mermaid (1993)
 The Faithful Friend (1997)
 Duke Ellington: The Piano Prince and His Orchestra (1999)

Boston Globe Horn Book Award 

 The Adventures of Sparrowboy (1997)

References

1961 births
Living people
American children's book illustrators
University of the Arts (Philadelphia) alumni
School of Visual Arts alumni
People from Prospect Heights, Brooklyn